Tianchi is an alpine lake in Xinjiang, Northwest China, situated at . The name (天池) literally means Heavenly Lake and can refer to several lakes in mainland China and Taiwan. It is an alpine drift lake shaped in the Quaternary Glacier period.

Formerly known as Yaochi ("Jade Lake"), it was named Tianchi in 1783 by Mingliang, the Qing Commander of Urumqi Command.

In 2006, it was designated for four years of restoration work at a cost of 800 million yuan (US$100 million). The plan calls for the tourism area around the lake to be increased from the present 158 km² to 548 km². The lake is classified as a highest level scenic area by the China National Tourism Administration.

The lake is accessible by Provincial Highway 111 from Fukang.

Climate

External links

http://www.farwestchina.com/2014/05/travelers-guide-xinjiangs-heavenly-lake.html
http://china.org.cn/english/environment/181476.htm
http://www.chinadaily.com.cn/bizchina/2006-09/18/content_691034.htm

References 

AAAAA-rated tourist attractions
Lakes of Xinjiang
Tian Shan
Tourist attractions in Xinjiang